Woollahra was an electoral district of the Legislative Assembly in the Australian state of New South Wales, originally created with the abolition of multi-member constituencies in 1894 from part of Paddington, along with Waverley and Randwick. It was named after and including the Sydney suburb of Woollahra. In 1920, with the introduction of proportional representation, it was absorbed into Eastern Suburbs. Woollahra was recreated in 1927 and abolished in 1962.

Members for Woollahra

Election results

References

Former electoral districts of New South Wales
Constituencies established in 1894
1894 establishments in Australia
Constituencies disestablished in 1920
1920 disestablishments in Australia
Constituencies established in 1927
1927 establishments in Australia
Constituencies disestablished in 1962
1962 disestablishments in Australia